Ikhtiyaruddin Ghazi Shah (reigned 1349–1352) was an independent sultan of Sonargaon.

History
Ikhtiyaruddin was the son and successor of Fakhruddin Mubarak Shah. During his reign in 1350, he lost Chittagong region to the king of Arakan.

Death
In 1352 Ilyas Shah, independent Sultan of Lakhnauti, who already captured Satgaon, attacked Sonargaon. In the battle Ikhtiyaruddin was defeated and killed. Thus for the first time in history, Bengal was unified comprising Sonargaon, Satgaon and Lakhnauti.

See also
 List of rulers of Bengal
 Sonargaon

References

Delhi Sultanate
Sultans of Bengal
People from Sonargaon Upazila